Talwood is a town in the rural locality of North Talwood in Goondiwindi Region, Queensland, Australia.

Geography 
Talwood is at the southern edge of the locality of North Talwood, immediately north of the boundary of South Talwood.

Talwood is on the South-Western railway line and is served by Talwood railway station.

History 
Gamilaraay (Gamilaroi, Kamilaroi, Comilroy) is a language from South-West Queensland and North-West New South Wales. The Gamilaraay language region includes the landscape within the local government boundaries of the Balonne Shire Council, including the towns of Dirranbandi, Thallon, Talwood and Bungunya as well as the border towns of Mungindi and Boomi extending to Moree, Tamworth and Coonabarabran in New South Wales.

The town's name is believed to be a corruption of Dalwood, a pastoral run name used from 1844, which was believed to be derived from an Aboriginal word. In 1903, it was spelled Tallwood on a survey plan with an annotation that it has been altered to Talwood, a name which was shown on a 1911 survey plan.

Tallwood Provisional School opened on 1911 but closed in the same year. Talwood State School opened on 4 November 1918

Education 
Talwood State School is a government primary (Prep-6) school for boys and girls at 17 Recreation Street. In 2018, the school had an enrolment of 28 students with 4 teachers (3 full-time equivalent) and 5 non-teaching staff (2 full-time equivalent).

There is no secondary school in Talwood. The nearest secondary school is Goondiwindi State High School in Goondiwindi to the east, but due to the distance, other options would be distance education and boarding school.

Amenities 
Talwood Post Office is at 25 Main Street.

Gallery

References

External links 

 Town map of Talwood, 1974

Towns in Queensland
Goondiwindi Region